Admetula emarginata is a species of sea snail, a marine gastropod mollusc in the family Cancellariidae, the nutmeg snails.

Description

Distribution

References

 Bouchet P. & Petit R.E. (2008). New species and new records of southwest Pacific Cancellariidae. The Nautilus 122(1): 1–18.

External links

Cancellariidae
Gastropods described in 2008